Padali Darya is a village in Parner taluka in Ahmednagar district of state of Maharashtra, India.

Religion
The majority of the population in the village is Hindu.

Economy
The majority of the population has farming as their primary occupation.

See also
 Parner taluka
 Villages in Parner taluka
The God Bhairavnath is GRAMDAIVAT of village. The three sides of village has surrounded by hills.
The distant between Padali Darya and Parner (tahsil)is 21 kilometer.

References

Villages in Parner taluka
Villages in Ahmednagar district